The Wadi Jarrah is a tributary of the Khabur River in northeastern Syria.

References

Jarrah
Tributaries of the Khabur (Euphrates)